Albion Municipal Airport  is a public use airport located three nautical miles (6 km) northwest of the central business district of Albion, in Boone County, Nebraska, United States. It is owned by the Albion Airport Authority. According to the FAA's National Plan of Integrated Airport Systems for 2009–2013, it is classified as a general aviation airport.

Although many U.S. airports use the same three-letter location identifier for the FAA and IATA, this airport is assigned BVN by the FAA but has no designation from the IATA.

Facilities and aircraft 
It has one runway designated 15/33 with a concrete surface measuring 3,700 by 60 feet (1,128 x 18 m).

For the 12-month period ending July 23, 2008, the airport had 5,100 general aviation aircraft operations, an average of 13 per day. At that time there were 11 aircraft based at this airport: 91% single-engine and 9% multi-engine.

References

External links 
 Aerial photo as of 4 May 1993 from USGS The National Map
 

Airports in Nebraska
Buildings and structures in Boone County, Nebraska